Lee Wan Yuen (born 20 November 1977) is a Malaysian taekwondo practitioner from Kuala Lumpur.

She competed at the 2000 Summer Olympics in Sydney. She won a silver medal in heavyweight at the 1998 Asian Games in Bangkok, and a bronze medal at the 2002 Asian Games. She won a bronze medal at the 1996 Asian Taekwondo Championships in Melbourne.

References

External links

1977 births
Living people
Malaysian female taekwondo practitioners
Olympic taekwondo practitioners of Malaysia
Taekwondo practitioners at the 2000 Summer Olympics
Taekwondo practitioners at the 1998 Asian Games
Taekwondo practitioners at the 2002 Asian Games
Asian Games medalists in taekwondo
Medalists at the 1998 Asian Games
Medalists at the 2002 Asian Games
Asian Games silver medalists for Malaysia
Asian Games bronze medalists for Malaysia
Asian Taekwondo Championships medalists
20th-century Malaysian women
21st-century Malaysian women